Party of Slovak Revival (SSO) was a political party founded in 1948 by pro-Communist members of the Slovak Democratic Party. It was accepted into the Czechoslovak National Front and got 17 seats in the Slovak parliament (Communists had 78 and the Freedom Party 4 seats). Jozef Mjartan, chairman of the SSO was the interim chairman of the Slovak parliament from 15 to 23 June 1958 and the party (as a satellite of the Communist party) had representatives in other government bodies during the Communist era. The Party of Slovak Revival broke with the Communist Party in 1989 and re-named to Democratic Party, but did not gain any importance in Slovak politics.

See also
National Front (Czechoslovakia)

Defunct political parties in Slovakia
Political parties in Czechoslovakia
Political parties established in 1948